Events from the year 1618 in art.

Events

Works
Anthony van Dyck
Saint Martin Dividing his Cloak
Jacob Jordaens
The Adoration of the Shepherds
Meleager and Atalanta
Peter Paul Rubens 
Charles the Bold
The Rape of the Daughters of Leucippus
The Union of Earth and Water (approximate year)
Diego Velázquez
Christ in the House of Martha and Mary
The Farmers' Lunch
Old Woman Cooking Eggs
The Three Musicians
The Waterseller of Seville (original version)

Births
January 1 (baptized) – Bartolomé Esteban Murillo, Spanish painter (died 1682)
June 28 – Jean Le Pautre, French designer and engraver (died 1682)
September 11 – Francesco Grue, Italian potter and painter (died 1673)
September 14 – Peter Lely, Dutch portrait painter (died 1680)
date unknown
Carlo Cane, Italian painter of the Baroque period (died 1688)
Ginevra Cantofoli, Italian painter (died 1672)
Gioseffo Danedi, Italian painter (died 1689)
Giovanni Battista Galestruzzi, Italian painter and etcher (died 1677)
Cornelis Holsteyn, Dutch painter of historical allegories, portraits, and interior decorations (died 1658)
Hishikawa Moronobu, Japanese painter (died 1694)
Gong Xian, Chinese painter (died 1689)
Giovanni Pietro Possenti, Italian painter of battle scenes (died 1659)
Pieter Hermansz Verelst, Dutch Golden Age genre art painter (died 1678)
probable (born 1618/1621) - Jacopo Chiavistelli, Italian painter of quadratura (died 1698)

Deaths
February 21 – Vittorio Baldini, Italian engraver
April 8 – Antonio Marziale Carracci, Italian painter (born 1583)
May 24 – Cornelis IJsbrantsz Cussens, Dutch draughtsman and glass painter (born 1580)
June 29 – Adriaen Collaert, Flemish engraver (born 1560)
date unknown
Luis de Carvajal, Spanish painter of the Renaissance period (born 1531)
Ambrosius Francken I, Flemish painter (born 1544)
Giovanni Guerra, Italian draughtsman and painter (born 1544)
Paolo Camillo Landriani, Italian painter (born c. 1560)
Pietro Malombra, Italian painter (born 1556)
Giulio Mazzoni, Italian painter and stuccoist (born 1525)
Camillo Rizzi (or Ricci), Italian painter (born 1580)
Ercole Setti, Italian engraver (born 1530)
Unkoku Togan, Japanese painter (born 1547)
Maffeo Verona, Italian painter (born 1576)

References

 
Years of the 17th century in art
1610s in art